Minuscule 524 (in the Gregory-Aland numbering), ε 265 (in the Soden numbering), is a Greek minuscule manuscript of the New Testament, on a parchment. Palaeographically it has been assigned to the 12th century. 
It was adapted for liturgical use. It has full marginalia.

Scrivener labeled it by number 490.

Description 

The codex contains the complete text of the four Gospels on 184 parchment leaves (size ). The text is written in one column per page, 21-28 lines per page.

There is also a division according to the Ammonian Sections, with references to the Eusebian Canons (written below Ammonian Section numbers).

Text 

The Greek text of the codex is a representative of the Byzantine text-type. Hermann von Soden classified it to the textual family K1. Aland placed it in Category V.
According to the Claremont Profile Method it represents the textual family Kx in Luke 10 and Luke 20. In Luke 1 it has mixed Byzantine text.

History 

It is dated by the INTF to the 12th century.

The manuscript once belonged to M. Aloys. Canonici, together with the manuscripts 522, 523, and 525, then to Bandinelli from Venice, and in 1817 was acquired by the Bodleian Library.

The manuscript was added to the list of New Testament minuscule manuscripts by F. H. A. Scrivener (490) and C. R. Gregory (524). Gregory saw it in 1883.

It is currently housed at the Bodleian Library (MS. Canon. Gr. 112) in Oxford.

See also 

 List of New Testament minuscules
 Biblical manuscript
 Textual criticism

References

Further reading 

 

Greek New Testament minuscules
12th-century biblical manuscripts
Bodleian Library collection